Hermano (Spanish for brother) or Hermana (sister) or Hermanos may refer to: 

Sibling, a brother or a sister

Places
Los Hermanos Archipelago, Venezuela

Film and TV
Hermanas, 2005 film
Hermano (film), a 2010 Venezuelan drama film
Hermanos (film), a 1939 Argentine drama directed by Enrique de Rosas
"Hermanos" (Breaking Bad), an episode from the fourth season of AMC's drama Breaking Bad
Los Pollos Hermanos, the fictional restaurant and occasional real-life pop-up from which the title derived its name
"Hermanos", an episode of One Day at a Time (2017 TV series)
Hermanos (short film) a 2018 drama film

Music
Hermano (band), an American stoner rock band
Los Hermanos, a Brazilian rock band
Los Hermanos (song)
 Proyecto Hermanos, a charity supergroup which recorded the 1985 single "Cantaré, cantarás"

See also
Hermann (disambiguation)
German (disambiguation)